Jessie McGuire Dent (1891–1948) was one of the 22 founders of the black sorority Delta Sigma Theta. After graduation and years of teaching at East District High School in Galveston, Texas, she successfully sued the Galveston independent school district for unequal pay of black teachers.

Early life 
She was born in Galveston, Texas on March 24, 1891, and died in Galveston, Texas on March 12, 1948.

Education and sorority involvement 
She attended high school at East District High School and graduated in 1908. This school was one of the first Black high schools in Texas, and was established in 1885. After graduation, she attended Howard University in Washington, DC, where she was enrolled in the teachers college. While at Howard, she became a member of the local sorority Alpha Kappa Alpha. During her membership, there was an internal dispute over becoming involved in the Movement for women's suffrage, which was becoming a major issue at the time. The 22 founders wanted more from Alpha Kappa Alpha than just a social club, and felt the sorority was not equipped to engage with social issues. Without a national perspective, they felt Alpha Kappa Alpha has hardly done anything to become a sorority, rather than to remain a social club. They wanted a group ready to respond to social issues such as the Great Migration, the aftermath of World War 1, and most relevantly, the women's Suffrage Movement.

From that internal dispute, Dent and 21 other members became the founders of a separate sorority under the name Delta Sigma Theta. They chose Delta to refer to in mathematics the way to denote a change. The members of Delta Sigma Theta marched in the Women's suffrage parade on March 3, 1913, in Washington, DC. The senior members, including

Dent, wore their caps and gowns when they marched with Mary Church Terrell in the segregated section of the procession. Though some members of Alpha Kappa Alpha may have marched that day, it is unclear how many.

While an active member of Delta Sigma Theta, Dent was installed as the first corresponding secretary of the Alpha chapter of Delta Sigma Theta.

After graduation 
After graduating, Dent returned to Galveston in 1913 and began teaching English and Latin at Central High School.

Jessie McGuire Dent remained active in the community after her graduation. This included serving as the Dean of Girls for Central High. She was also active in The Colored Unit of the Women's Christian Temperance League, the National Association for the Advancement of Colored People (N.A.A.C.P), the Federation of Colored Women's Clubs, and in 1941, she joined the Colored Teachers State Association's Texas Commission on Democracy in Education.

Family 
in 1929 Jessie McGuire married Thomas Henry Dent. They produced a child in 1929 named Thomas Henry Dent Jr. Their marriage ended in 1934 and their son passed shortly after in 1940.[{cn}} As she did not have family to inherit her estate, she and fellow founding sister Frederica Chase Dodd developed a 'survivors will'. This 'survivor's will' stated that the sister who out lived the other would inherit their estate. Dodd outlived Dent by twenty-four years, and thus inherited Dent's estate.

Suing the Galveston Public School District 
When Dent first started teaching for Galveston Central High School in 1913, she was paid $50 a month. By 1943, after 30 years of teaching, she was only paid $1,548 annually. This was about 20% less than the district paid white teachers,. She and her attorney, William J. Durham of Sherman, Texas, sued the Galveston Public School System in Federal court under a violation of the 14th Amendment rights of equal protection under the law. On June 15, 1943, her lawsuit was settled in favor of black teachers and administrations.

As a result, the school board was required to fully equalize pay of black and white teachers by 1945. Beyond her activism for equal salaries, Dent continued to advocate for integration in Galveston's public schools.

Now the Galveston public school district has been awarded an A, 10 years in a row for financial integrity rating. Currently, the school district has a beginner's teachers salary of $53,550, with an average of $57,485, and a max salary of $74,815. These salaries are not discriminative based on race. Though the school district does not mention Dent or her lawsuit, they boast about their high salaries that is a result of Dents 1943 case. Additionally, Dent's goal of integration for Galveston public school systems have been realized as evident in the demographic information provided from the district in January 2021. The school system has about 23.4% African Americans, 49.3% Hispanic, 23.9% White, 1.9% Asian, <1% Native Americans and 3.1% of students are two or more races.

References

External links
 Jessie McGuire Dent (1891-1948) - Find A Grave

Wikipedia Student Program
Delta Sigma Theta founders
1891 births
1948 deaths
People from Galveston, Texas
20th-century African-American women
20th-century African-American people
Schoolteachers from Texas
Women civil rights activists
African-American schoolteachers